Bayard was a three masted, 67 metre long, 1,028 ton, sailing ship built by T. Vernon and Son, Liverpool for the Hall Line in 1864. In 1868 she was transferred to Sun Shipping Company and in 1881 sold to Foley and Company.

On 20 August 1883 she arrived in Suva, Fiji carrying 494 Indian indentured labourers from Calcutta. She had previously carried indentured labourers to the West Indies.

On 6 May 1885, Bayard hit an iceberg,  South of Cape Race while on a voyage from Marseilles to St. Pierre. The ship lost her stern, bowsprit, jib-boom, foremast, topgallantmast and yard, but reached her destination on 23 May, leaking badly.

She was later used as a coaling ship for the whaling station in South Georgia. Bayard lost her mooring at the coaling pier in Ocean Harbour during a severe gale on 6 June 1911 and ran aground on the rocks on the southern side of the bay, where the wreck still remains, as a breeding site for blue-eyed shags.

See also 
 Indian indenture system
 Indian indenture ships to Fiji
 Indians in Fiji

References 

1864 ships
Ships built on the River Mersey
Indian indenture ships to Fiji
Ship collisions with icebergs
Victorian-era passenger ships of the United Kingdom
Individual sailing vessels
Maritime incidents in May 1885
Maritime incidents in 1911
Shipwrecks in the Atlantic Ocean
June 1911 events
May 1885 events